The Ayrshire Football Combination was formed in 1893 as a breakaway from the Ayrshire Football League. Its original membership was Annbank F.C., Ayr F.C., Ayr Parkhouse F.C., Hurlford F.C., Kilbirnie, Kilmarnock F.C. and Stevenston Thistle F.C.

In 1897 Ayr F.C. joined the Scottish Football League and this sounded the death knell of the Combination.

Champions
1893–94 Annbank
1894–95 Ayr
1895–96 Ayr
1896–97 Ayr

Membership
Annbank 1893–1895
Ayr 1893–1897
Ayr Parkhouse 1893–1897
Beith1895–1897
Galston 1896–1897
Hurlford 1893–1897
Irvine 1895–1897
Kilbirnie 1893–18894
Kilmarnock 1893–1895
Kilmarnock Athletic 1894–1896
Kilwinning Monkcastle 1894–1897
Salcoats Victoria 1894–1895
Stevenson Thistle 1893–1897

References

See also
 Scottish Football (Defunct Leagues)

Defunct football leagues in Scotland
Sport in Ayrshire
1893 establishments in Scotland
1897 disestablishments in Scotland
Sports leagues established in 1893
Sports leagues disestablished in 1897